Imnadia panonica is a species of crustaceans in the family Limnadiidae. It is endemic to Serbia and Montenegro.

References

Spinicaudata
Freshwater crustaceans of Europe
Taxonomy articles created by Polbot
Crustaceans described in 1984